Black Magic for White Boys is a 2017 American comedy film written by, directed by and starring Onur Tukel. The film premiered at the 2017 Tribeca TV portion of the Tribeca Film Festival.

Cast
Ronald Guttman as Larry
Onur Tukel as Oscar
Charlie LaRose as Chase
Tavares Jamal Cherry as Bryson
Eva Dorrepaal as Lucy
Colin Buckingham as Dean
Franck Raharinosy as Fred
Matt Hopkins as Carl at Systems Tech (voice)
Brendan Miller as Ralphie
Kevin Corrigan

Reception
The film has an 88% rating on Rotten Tomatoes, based on eight reviews with an average rating of 6.33/10.

References

External links
 
 

American comedy films
2017 comedy films
2010s English-language films
2010s American films